The Chevrolet Corvette (C1) is the first generation of the Corvette sports car produced by Chevrolet. It was introduced late in the 1953 model year and produced through 1962. This generation is commonly referred to as the "solid-axle" generation, as the independent rear suspension did not appear until the 1963 Stingray. 

The Corvette was rushed into production for its debut model year to capitalize on the enthusiastic public reaction to the concept vehicle, but expectations for the new model were largely unfulfilled. Reviews were mixed and sales fell far short of expectations through the car's early years. The program was nearly canceled, but Chevrolet decided to make necessary improvements.

History

Origins

Harley Earl, as head of GM's Styling Section, was an avid fan of sports cars. He recognized that GIs returning after serving overseas in the years following World War II were bringing home MGs, Jaguars, and Alfa Romeos. In 1951, Nash Motors began selling an expensive two-seat sports car, the Nash-Healey, that was made in partnership with the Italian designer Pininfarina and British auto engineer Donald Healey, but there were few moderate-priced models. Earl convinced GM that they needed to build an all-American two-seat sports car, and with his Special Projects crew began working on the new car in late 1951. The last time Chevrolet offered a 2-door, 2-passenger convertible/roadster body style was in 1938 with the Chevrolet Master.

Prototype EX-122
The secretive effort was code-named "Project Opel" (after GM's German division Opel). The result was the hand-built, EX-122 pre-production Corvette prototype, which was first shown to the public at the 1953 General Motors Motorama at the Waldorf-Astoria in New York City on January 17, 1953. When production began six months later, at an MSRP of US$3,513 ($ in  dollars ), it had evolved into a considerably costlier car than the basic $2,000 roadster Harley Earl originally had in mind. The EX-122 car is now located at the Kerbeck Corvette museum in Atlantic City and is believed to be the oldest Corvette in existence.

Design and engineering
To keep costs down, GM executive Robert F. McLean mandated off-the-shelf mechanical components. The new car used the chassis and suspension design from the 1949 through 1954 Chevrolet passenger vehicles. The drivetrain and passenger compartment were moved rearward to achieve a 53/47 front-to-rear weight distribution. It had a  wheelbase. The engine was a  inline six engine that was similar to the 235 engine that powered all other Chevrolet car models, but with a higher-compression ratio, three Carter side-draft carburetors, mechanical lifters, and a higher-lift camshaft. Because there was currently no manual transmission available to Chevrolet rated to handle 150 HP, a two-speed Powerglide automatic was used. The  time was 11.5 seconds.

Three body variants were created. The roadster was built as the Corvette, the Corvair fastback variant never went into production, and the two-door Nomad station wagon was eventually built as the Chevrolet Nomad.

During the last half of 1953, 300 Corvettes were to a large degree, hand-built on a makeshift assembly line that was installed in an old truck plant in Flint, Michigan while a factory was being prepped for a full-scale 1954 production run. The outer body was made out of then-revolutionary glass fiber reinforced plastic material. Although steel shortages or quotas are sometimes mentioned as a factor in the decision to use fiberglass, no evidence exists to support this. In calendar years 1952 and 1953 Chevrolet produced nearly 2 million steel-bodied full-size passenger cars and the intended production volume of 10,000 Corvettes for 1954 was only a small fraction of that.

The body engineer for the Corvette was Ellis James Premo. He presented a paper to the Society of Automotive Engineers in 1954 regarding the development of the body. Several excerpts highlight some of the key points in the body material choice:

A 55-degree raked windshield was made of safety glass, while the license plate holder was set back in the trunk, covered with a plastic window. Underneath the new body material were standard components from Chevrolet's regular car line, including the "Blue Flame" inline six-cylinder engine, two-speed Powerglide automatic transmission, and drum brakes. The engine's output was increased to  via a Carter triple-carburetor system exclusive to the Corvette, but performance of the car was decidedly "lackluster". Compared to the British and Italian sports cars of the day, the Corvette lacked a manual transmission and required more effort to bring to a stop, but like their British competition, such as Morgan, was not fitted with roll-up windows; this would have to wait until some time in the 1956 model year. A Paxton centrifugal supercharger became available in 1954 as a dealer-installed option, greatly improving the Corvette's straight-line performance, but sales continued to decline.

The Chevrolet division was GM's entry-level marque. Managers at GM were seriously considering shelving the project, leaving the Corvette to be little more than a footnote in automotive history, and would have done so if not for three important events. The first was the 1955 introduction of Chevrolet's first V8 engine since 1919.  the new  265 small-block became available with a Powerglide automatic transmission, until the middle of the production year when a manual 3-speed became available, coupled to a 3.55:1 axle ratio, the only one offered. The engine was fitted with a single 2218S or 2351S WCFB four-barrel (four-choke) Carter carburetor. The combination turned the "rather anemic Corvette into a credible if not outstanding performer". The second was the influence of a Russian émigré in GM's engineering department, Zora Arkus-Duntov. The third factor in the Corvette's survival was Ford's introduction of the 1955 two-seat Thunderbird, which was billed as a "personal luxury car", not a sports car. Even so, the Ford-Chevrolet rivalry in those days demanded GM not appear to back down from the challenge. The original concept for the Corvette emblem incorporated an American flag into the design, but was changed well before production since associating the flag with a product was frowned upon.

1953–1955

1953
The 1953 model year was not only the Corvette's first production year, but at 300 produced it was also the lowest-volume Corvette. The cars were essentially hand-built and techniques evolved during the production cycle so that each 1953 Corvette is slightly different. All 1953 models had red interiors, Polo white exteriors, and painted blue engines (a reference to the three colors represented on the Flag of the United States, where the Corvette was assembled) as well as black canvas soft tops. Order guides showed heaters and AM radios as optional, but all 1953 models were equipped with both. Over two hundred 1953 Corvettes are known to exist today. They had independent front suspension, but featured a rigid axle supported by longitudinal leaf springs at the rear. The cost of the first production model Corvettes in 1953 was US$3,490 ($38,795 in 2023 dollars ).

The quality of the fiberglass body as well as its fit and finish were lacking. Other problems, such as water leaks and doors that could open while the car was driven, were reported with the most severe errors corrected in subsequent units produced, but some shortcomings continued beyond the Corvette's inaugural year. By December 1953, Chevrolet had a newly-equipped factory in St. Louis ready to build 10,000 Corvettes annually. However, negative customer reactions to 1953 and early 1954 models caused sales to fall short of expectations.

1954
In 1954, a total of 3,640 of this model were built and nearly a third were unsold at year's end. New colors were available, but the six-cylinder engine and Powerglide automatic, the only engine and transmission available, were not what sports car enthusiasts expected. It is known that 1954 models were painted Pennant Blue, Sportsman Red, and Black, in addition to Polo White. All had red interiors, except for those finished in Pennant Blue which had a beige interior and beige canvas soft top. Order guides listed several options, but all options were "mandatory" and all 1954 Corvettes were equipped the same.

In the October 1954 issue of Popular Mechanics, there was an extensive survey of Corvette owners in America. The surprising finding was their opinions in comparison to foreign sports cars. It was found that 36% of those taking the survey had owned a foreign sports car, and of that, half of them rated the Corvette as better than their previous foreign sports car. Nineteen percent rated the Corvette as equal to their foreign sports car and 22% rated the Corvette as inferior. While many were well pleased with the Corvette, they did not consider it a true sports car. The principal complaint of the surveyed owners was the tendency of the body to leak extensively during rainstorms.

1955
Chevrolet debuted its  small-block,  V8 in 1955 and the engine was available for the Corvette. Early production 1955 V8 Corvettes continued with the mandatory-option Powerglide automatic transmission (as did the few 6-cylinder models built). A new three-speed manual transmission became available later in the year for V8 models, but was not popular with about 75 equipped with it. Exterior color choices were expanded to at least five, combined with at least four interior colors. Soft-tops came in white, dark green, or beige and different materials. A total of 700 1955 Corvettes were built, making it second only to 1953 in scarcity. The "V" in the Corvette emblem was enlarged and gold colored, signifying the V8 engine and 12-volt electrical systems, while 6-cylinder models retained the 6-volt systems used in 1953-54.

Although not a part of the original Corvette project, Zora Arkus-Duntov was responsible for the addition of the V8 engine and three-speed manual transmission. Duntov improved the car's marketing and image and helped the car compete with the new V8—engined Ford Thunderbird, Studebaker Speedster and the larger Chrysler C-300, and turned the Corvette from its lackluster performance into a credible performer. In 1956 he became the director of high-performance vehicle design and development for Chevrolet helping him earn the nickname "Father of the Corvette."

Although the C1 Corvette chassis and suspension design were derived from Chevrolet's full-size cars, the same basic design was continued through the 1962 model even after the full-size cars were completely redesigned for the 1955 model year.

1956–1957

1956
The 1956 Corvette featured a new body, with real glass roll-up windows and a more substantial convertible top. The straight-6 engine was discontinued, leaving only the  V8. The standard transmission remained the 3-speed manual with an optional 2-speed Powerglide automatic. Other options included power assisted convertible top, a removable hardtop, power windows, and a "then-leading edge" signal-seeking partially transistorized Delco car radio. A high-performance camshaft was also available (as RPO 449) with the  engine.

1957
Visually the 1957 model was unchanged. Debate continues to swirl whether this was underrated by Chevrolet (to allow for lower insurance premiums, or give the car an advantage in certain forms of racing) rather than overrated, as was common practice at the time (to juice sales). Either way, it was advertised as producing "One HP per cubic inch", allowing it to claim it was one of the first mass-produced engines to do so. 

Pushed toward high-performance and racing, principally by its designer, Zora Arkus-Duntov, who had raced in Europe, 1957 Corvettes could be ordered ready-to-race with special performance options, such as an engine fresh air/tach package, heavy-duty racing suspension, and  wheels.

Also in 1957, Chevrolet developed a new racing variation of the Corvette with the aim to compete in the 24 Hours of Le Mans race. Originally known as Project XP-64, it would eventually become known as the Corvette SS. It featured a tuned version of the new 283 CID V8 and a specialized tubular space frame chassis. However, after a rear bushing failure retired the car during a 1957 Sebring race, the AMA announced a ban on motor racing in April of 1957 for member companies like GM, leading to the cancellation of further developments of the Corvette SS platform.

Sales volume was 3,467, a low number by any contemporary standard and less than 1954's 3,640, making it the third lowest in Corvette history. Fuel-injected models were in short supply and 1,040 were sold.

1958–1960

1958
In an era of chrome and four headlamps, the Corvette adapted to the look of the day. The 1958 model year and the four that followed all had the exposed four-headlamp treatment and prominent grilles, but a faux-louvered hood and chrome trunk spears were unique to this model year. The interior and instruments were updated, including placing a tachometer directly in front of the driver. For the 1958 model, an 8000 rpm tachometer was used with the  engines, rather than the 6000 rpm units used in the lower horsepower engines. Optional engine choices included two with twin carburetors (including a  version with Carter 2613S and 2614S WCFB four-barrels) and two with fuel injection. Displacement remained . For the first time, seat belts were factory-installed rather than dealer-installed as on previous models. Options that were not popular included RPO 684 heavy-duty brakes and suspension (144), RPO 579  engine (554), and RPO 276 15×5.5-inch steel road wheels (404).

1959

For the 1959 model, engines and horsepower ratings did not change. The interiors were revised slightly with different instrument graphics and the addition of a storage bin to the passenger side. A positive reverse lockout shifter with "T" handle was standard with 4-speed manual transmission. This was the only year a turquoise convertible top color could be ordered, and all 24-gallon fuel tank models through 1962 could not be ordered with convertible tops due to inadequate space for the folding top mechanism. Rare options: RPO 684 heavy-duty brakes and suspension (142), RPO 686 metallic brakes (333), RPO 276 15"×5.5" wheels (214), RPO 426 power windows (547), RPO 473 power convertible top (661).

1960

The last features to appear in 1960 models included taillamps molded into the rear fenders and heavy grill teeth. New features include aluminum radiators, but only with  engines. Also for the first time, all fuel-injection engines required manual transmissions. The 1960s Cascade Green was metallic, unique to the year, and the most infrequent color at 140 made. Options that were not often ordered included RPO 579  engine (100), RPO 687 heavy-duty brakes and suspension (119), RPO 276 15×5.5-inch steel road wheels (246), RPO 473 power convertible top (512), and RPO 426 power windows (544).

1961–1962

1961
Twin taillights appeared on the 1961, a treatment that continues to this day. Output ratings for the dual-four barrel engines did not change, but this was the last year of their availability. This was the last year for contrasting paint colors in cove areas, and the last two-tone Corvette of any type until 1978. Also debuting in 1961 was a new boat-tail that was carried through to the C2. Infrequently ordered options included RPO 353  engine (118), RPO 687 heavy-duty brakes and steering (233), RPO 276 15×5.5-inch steel road wheels (357), and RPO 473 power convertible top (442).

1962
With a new larger engine the 1962 model year Corvette was the quickest to date. Hydraulic valve lifters were used in the standard and optional  engines, solid lifters in the optional carbureted  and fuel-injected  versions. Dual 4-barrel carburetor engines were no longer available. 

1962 saw the last solid-rear-axle suspension, that had been used from the beginning. Rocker panel trim was seen for the first time, and exposed headlights for the last, until 2005. This was the last Corvette model to offer an optional power convertible top mechanism. Rare options: RPO 488 24-gallon fuel tank (65), RPO 687 heavy-duty brakes and steering (246), RPO 473 power convertible top (350), RPO 276 15"×5.5" wheels (561).

Scaglietti Corvette

In 1959, a Texan oil well drilling contractor named Gary Laughlin wondered if it would be possible to create a vehicle with Italian design characteristics using the chassis and engine components from an American car like the Corvette. To oversee this creation, he enlisted the help of car constructer Jim Hall and race car driver Carroll Shelby, whom he was good friends with, to assist with the engineering of the project and, after their efforts, each man was to receive their own Corvette custom made to their liking. Thus, the trio managed to get three rolling Corvette chassis off of the production line and arranged to have them shipped to Modena, Italy. There, with the help of Road & Track correspondent Pete Coltrin, they managed to get in touch with Italian coachbuilder Sergio Scaglietti, famous for his design work on Ferrari road cars at the time. Scaglietti agreed to create and fit a new lightweight aluminium body to each car in secret, as Enzo Ferrari reportedly threatened to cancel Scaglietti's partnership with him after learning of the project. The resulting Scaglietti Corvette ended up weighing roughly 400 lbs less than any other Corvette at the time.

Each of the three cars assembled were unique for each owner:

Car #1, originally for Laughlin, was finished in red. It used a slightly different body to accommodate for an existing Corvette front grille. It originally came with a 283 cu in V8 with 315 hp and a four-barrel carburetor, mated to a 2-speed automatic transmission.

Car #2, originally for Hall, was finished in blue. This version had a body more closely resembling the Ferrari 250 GT Berlinetta LWB. It came with the same carbureted V8 and automatic transmission as Car #1.

Car #3, originally for Shelby, was finished in red. This model was somewhat unique as though it used a similarly designed body to Car #2, it was the only model fitted with fuel-injection and a Borg-Warner 4-speed manual transmission. Unlike the other two members of the project, Shelby never took delivery of his car, citing that it was too expensive for his purposes for it.

However, the Scaglietti Corvette was not without its issues. Though conceived in 1959, the final projects wouldn't be completed and shipped back to the US until 1961, by which time it became clear that the aluminum bodies, though much lighter, had caused dramatic effects to the Corvette's chassis, resulting in dangerous front end lift at high speeds. Coupled with legal pressure from General Motors and Enzo Ferrari to put an end to production, and the Scaglietti Corvette project would be forever cemented as only a concept. However, many ideas from the car would prove inspirational, leading Jim Hall to found his Chevrolet-powered Chaparral racing team and Carroll Shelby to revisit the idea of a European-American sports car with the AC Cobra.

Production notes

Engines

See also 
 Mako Shark (concept car)
 Chevrolet Engineering Research Vehicle
 Zora Arkus-Duntov
 GM Motorama
 Corvette C2
 Chevrolet Corvette SS

References

Notes

Bibliography

External links

The Corvette Museum: Corvette Timeline

C1
24 Hours of Le Mans race cars
1960s cars
Cars introduced in 1953
Cars discontinued in 1962